The Glass House is a novel written by the award-winning Australian novelist, Sonya Hartnett. It was first published in 1990 in Australia by Pan Macmillan.

1990 Australian novels
Novels by Sonya Hartnett
Pan Books books